{{Infobox person
| name = Sussan Taunton
| imagesize = 
| caption = 
| birth_date = 
| birthname = Sussan Grace Taunton Thomas
| birth_place =  Santiago, Chile
| height = 5' 8 (1.73 m)
| spouse = Claudio Antonovich
}}

Sussan Grace Taunton Thomas (popularly known as Sussan Taunton; born February 13, 1970) is a Mexican actress, she was born in Chile.

Biography
Sussan is a Mexican actress, studied acting at the Centro de Educación Artística of Televisa for over 3 years. Sussan began her career as an actress with a small participation in 1990 in the telenovela El milagro de vivir , produced by Televisión Nacional de Chile; this was the first telenovela produced by the state network after the end of the military dictatorship in Chile. She came to Mexico seeking for an opportunity in 1988 and became an instant hit, having notable roles in the most important soap operas of Televisa. She has made over a hundred TV commercials throughout her career, some being the spokeswoman of important brands such as Calvin Klein Latin America, Marinela (Bimbo), Scribe (notenooks) and magazines such as Vogue and Hola Mexico. She dated Diego Schoening, who wanted and helped her to become a member of Timbiriche but her rivalry with Paulina Rubio was stronger and the producers decided to keep Paulina and choose Thalia instead, moreover Sussan has performed in many important plays mainly in Mexico. Sussan was nominated for a Latin Grammy in 1995.

She revealed in July 1999 in the late show Otro Rollo with Adal Ramones that she was kidnapped for over 2 months when she was 12 years old in Durango, Mexico.

Sussan Taunton, studied alongside Jorge Salinas at the Centro de Educación Artística of Televisa.

She dated Carlos Espejel, Diego Schoening, Jose Alberto Castro, Aitor Iturrioz, Claudio Antonovich (father of their 2 daughters), Hector Soberon, among many others.

Family

She has 2 daughters and 4 siblings. Her father is Thomas Taunton and her mother is Silvia Thomas, both Chilean descendants of British settlers.

Telenovelas
 El milagro de vivir (1990) .... Martita
 La picara soñadora (1991) .... Agripina
 Mágica juventud (1992–1993) .... Claudia
 Dos mujeres, un camino (1993–1994) .... Susy
 Volver a Empezar (1994-1995) .... Rita
 El premio mayor (1995-1996) .... Déborah Domenzáin
 Luz Clarita (1996–1997) .... Érika Lomelí
 Camila (1998–1999) .... Renata
 El niño que vino del mar (1999) .... Bernardette Fontaner
 Cuando me enamoro (2010-2011) .... Luciana Peniche
 Esperanza del corazón (2011-2012) .... Karyme
 Porque el amor manda (2012-2013) .... Delia Torres
 Por siempre mi amor (2013-2014) .... Lorenza
 Mi corazón es tuyo (2014-2015) .... Doctora
 Pasión y poder'' (2015-2016) .... Agripina

Notes

References

External links

Serials entry for Sussan Taunton
Telenovela-World entry for Sussan Taunton
FilmWeb entry for Sussan Taunton

1970 births
Living people
Mexican telenovela actresses
Chilean emigrants to Mexico
Mexican people of English descent
Mexican actresses
Actresses from Santiago